School for Marriage is a 1954 West German comedy film directed by Rainer Geis and Anton Schelkopf and starring Wolf Albach-Retty, Cornell Borchers, and Liselotte Pulver. It was shot at the Bavaria Studios in Munich and on location in the Alps and in Paris. The film's sets were designed by the art director Ludwig Reiber.

Cast

References

Bibliography

External links 
 

1954 films
1954 romantic comedy films
German romantic comedy films
West German films
1950s German-language films
German black-and-white films
1950s German films
Films shot at Bavaria Studios